Mariana Tonetti Roriz (born October 3, 1980 in São Paulo) is a female water polo player from Brazil, who twice won the bronze medal with the Brazil women's national water polo team at the Pan American Games: 1999 and 2003.

References
  Profiles

1980 births
Living people
Brazilian female water polo players
Water polo players from São Paulo
Pan American Games bronze medalists for Brazil
Pan American Games medalists in water polo
Water polo players at the 1999 Pan American Games
Water polo players at the 2003 Pan American Games
Medalists at the 1999 Pan American Games
Medalists at the 2003 Pan American Games
21st-century Brazilian women